Matam (Hebrew  מת"ם - מרכז תעשיות מדע Merkaz Ta'asiyot Mada lit. acronym of Scientific Industries Center), located at the southern entrance to Haifa, is the largest and oldest dedicated hi-tech park in Israel. The Park is an international technology center, with some of the world's leading hi-tech companies maintaining research and development facilities, including Amazon, Intel,  Microsoft, Yahoo!, Philips, Google, Qualcomm, CSR, NDS Group, Elbit Systems, Apple, Plus500, Matrix, Aladdin Knowledge Systems, NetManage, ProcessGene, and Neustar.

Location

The park is situated on a main thoroughfare, between highway 2 and highway 4, and near the public transportation hub of the Carmel Beach Railway Station and Central Bus Station. The Carmel Tunnels' west portals, which opened in December 2010, provide easy access by car to the park from areas north and east of Haifa.

History 
Matam Park was founded in the 1970s by the Haifa Economic Corporation, and has been gradually expanded ever since. One of the first tenants in the Park was Intel, which set up its Haifa research and development center in 1974, and today has over 5000 employees in Matam. Today the park is 51% owned by Gav-Yam Bayside Land Corporation (TASE:BYSD) and 49% by the Haifa Economic Corporation.

Description 
Matam Park is a closed campus, covering an area of approximately 220,000 square meters with about 8000 employees. The Park includes buildings covering an area of approximately 270,000 square meters. Future plans for the Park include expansion by an additional 100,000 square meters. A central management and maintenance company provides a variety of services to the occupants, such as central air-conditioning, cafeterias, children day centers, a medical clinic, transport facilities, a post office, a petrol station and car parking areas.

See also
Silicon Wadi 
Jerusalem Technology Park
Startup Village, Yokneam
Technion

References

External links
Official website

Neighborhoods of Haifa
Industrial parks in Israel
Science parks in Israel